Jayadevappa Halappa Patel  (Kannada:ಜಯದೇವಪ್ಪ ಹಾಲಪ್ಪ ಪಟೇಲ್; 1 October 1930 – 12 December 2000) was the 9th Chief Minister of Karnataka from 31 May 1996 to 7 October 1999.

Biography
J.H. Patel was born on 1 October 1930 in Kariganur, now in Davanagere district, Karnataka. A Graduate in Law, he married Sarvamangala and had three sons Trishul, Satish and Mahima.  
J.H. Patel participated in the freedom struggle in 1942 and was imprisoned. A staunch socialist and an ardent follower of Ram Manohar Lohia, as a youth, he was inspired by Shantaveri Gopala Gowda. Patel's oratory skills left his mark on many. He remained a non-Congress leader throughout his life and was the one of the pillars of Janata Dal in Karnataka. He belonged to banajiga sub-sect of Lingayat community.

Political career
He was elected to Lok Sabha from Shimoga constituency in 1967, and was the first Kannadiga to table his debates in Kannada. Patel created history in Lok Sabha in 1967 when he spoke in his mother tongue Kannada in the house. The then Speaker of the Lok Sabha, Neelam Sanjiva Reddy allowed and encouraged Patel to go ahead with his speech. The house heard him with rapt attention. The Indian parliament had been active for 17 years and Patel became the first member to speak in a regional Indian language. He did so in vindication of the eighth schedule of the Indian constitution in which all the great languages of India have been given a pride of Place. This prompted the Speaker of Lok Sabha, Sanjiva Reddy to decree in his famous ruling that henceforth any member of the Lok Sabha who is inclined to exercise his/her inherent right to speak in his/her mother tongue would do so without any hindrance.

Patel was imprisoned during the Emergency from 1975 to 1977. Later, he was elected to the Karnataka Legislative Assembly from Channagiri constituency in 1978. He was elected for the second term in 1983, and served as a cabinet minister in the Janata Party government headed by Ramakrishna Hegde. Patel also served as a minister in S R Bommai's government, and became the Deputy Chief Minister in 1994 when the Janata Dal returned to power under the leadership of H. D. Deve Gowda. He succeeded Gowda in 1996 following the latter's elevation to the post of Prime minister. He was the first Chief minister of Karnataka who was never a member of the Indian National Congress.

The most significant achievement of Patel's government was the formation of seven new districts in the State which was a long-delayed decision. His administration also gave impetus to Information Technology and attracted foreign investment. His government was also known for investing Rs. 4,800 crores on irrigation projects such as Ghataprabha, Malaprabha, modernisation of Visvesvaraya Canal, work on Varuna Canal and near completion of the Alamatti Dam across the Krishna River.

Patel witnessed turbulent days as Chief minister following the expulsion of his mentor Ramakrishna Hegde from the party and the split in the Janata Dal into the Janata Dal (United) in which he remained; and the Janata Dal (Secular), led by Deve Gowda. His political acumen came to fore when he deftly handled stiff dissidence from fellow partymen throughout his tenure. When party affairs took a turn for the worse, Patel stunned every one including his detractors by recommending dissolution of the state assembly, six months ahead of the assembly polls in 1999. He merged his faction with Hegde's Lok Shakti and entered into an alliance with the Bharatiya Janata Party. In his last election, a young candidate Vadnal Rajanna defeated him and his party also suffered a massive defeat.

Patel died at the Manipal Hospital, Bangalore on 12 December 2000. He was buried with State honours at his native village, Kariganur. During his last days, Patel had been making efforts for the merger of the two Janata Dal factions.

He was a great orator, a witty leader, an astute politician and an acclaimed parliamentarian. A nonchalant leader, Patel endeared himself to his political adversaries by his affectionate and friendly attitude. A deft handler of any situation, Patel had the capability to withstand criticism and was endowed with abundant patience to dismiss them cheerfully.

References

http://www.kla.kar.nic.in/assembly/elib/pdf/eresources/J%20H%20Patel.pdf

External links
Official biographical sketch in Parliament of India website

|-

|-

1930 births
2000 deaths
Chief Ministers of Karnataka
Deputy Chief Ministers of Karnataka
People from Shimoga district
People from Davanagere district
India MPs 1967–1970
Lok Sabha members from Karnataka
Indians imprisoned during the Emergency (India)
20th-century Indian lawyers
Chief ministers from Janata Dal
Samyukta Socialist Party politicians
Janata Dal politicians
Janata Party politicians
Janata Dal (United) politicians
Lok Shakti politicians